The women's 400 metres hurdles at the 2021 World Athletics U20 Championships was held at the Kasarani Stadium on 19 and 22 August.

Records

Results

Heats
Qualification: First 2 of each heat (Q) and the 2 fastest times (q) qualified for the final.

Final
The final was held on 22 August at 15:00.

References

400 metres hurdles
400 metres hurdles at the World Athletics U20 Championships
U20